Manitoba Provincial Road 351 is an east-west provincial road in the south-central section of the Canadian province of Manitoba.

Route description 

PR 351 is a short east-west highway that begins and ends at the Trans-Canada Highway. The western terminus is located near the unincorporated community of Hughes, while the eastern terminus is just west of Sidney. PR 351 provides direct east-west access to the town of Carberry, where it is known as 1st Avenue within the town limits.

PR 351 is paved for its entire length.

History 

PR 351 was part of the original Highway 1 prior to 1958.

In 1962, Highway 1 became part of the Trans-Canada Highway. The route was given its current designation when the Manitoba government implemented its secondary highway system in 1966.

References

External links 
Manitoba Official Map - Southwest
 

351